Judah Hernandez (born November 26, 1986) is a Trinidadian soccer midfielder who currently plays for Canadian club Oakville Blue Devils FC.

Career
Hernandez was born in Trinidad and Tobago and raised in the United States. He has played for Ajax Orlando Prospects, Canadian Soccer League sides Oakville Blue Devils , Toronto Lynx, Brampton United and Burlington SC, as well as playing for Kent Athletic in England, and Caledonia AIA in Trinidad and Tobago. He has also played for the Trinidad and Tobago national football team. He made his first appearance for the senior team on 5 January 2006 in a friendly match against England.

References

1986 births
Living people
Association football midfielders
Trinidad and Tobago footballers
Trinidad and Tobago international footballers
Expatriate soccer players in the United States
Expatriate soccer players in Canada
Expatriate footballers in England
Trinidad and Tobago expatriates in Canada
South Florida Bulls men's soccer players
Ajax Orlando Prospects players
Toronto Lynx players
Brampton United players
Canadian Soccer League (1998–present) players
TT Pro League players
League1 Ontario players
Morvant Caledonia United players
Blue Devils FC players
Halton United players